Hidișel may refer to the following places in Romania:

Hidișel, a village in the commune Dobrești, Bihor County
Hidișel (Holod), a tributary of the Holod in Bihor County
Hidișel (Peța), a tributary of the Peța in Bihor County